The Battle for the Paddle is the result of a game postponement. In fall 1998, the Nicholls Colonels were scheduled to take on the Texas State Bobcats. Prior to the game, heavy rains flooded San Marcos, Texas and the field at Texas State. Athletic directors and coaches from both schools decided to postpone the game and coined the annual contest the "Battle for the Paddle," joking that fans and athletes needed to use a boat and paddle to get to the game. The game eventually took place on November 28, 1998 with Texas State prevailing 28–27 to win the Paddle Trophy.

Nicholls Head Coach and offensive guru Charlie Stubbs brought controversy to the rivalry in 2011, when he refused to bring the Paddle Trophy to San Marcos due to Texas State having a scholarship advantage as an FCS transitional school, stating "we ain't bringing the damn thing." Texas State won the Battle for the Paddle 38–12. The two teams met in 2019, with Texas State winning 24–3. The next scheduled meeting will be in 2025.

Nicholls leads series 16–15.

Game results

See also
 List of NCAA college football rivalry games

References

College football rivalries in the United States
Nicholls Colonels football
Texas State Bobcats football